Tupuji Imere FC is a Vanuatuan football team based in Port Vila. Besides football, the club also has a Basketball, and a Futsal team named Tupuji Ambassadors. The Basketball team plays in the Port Vila Womens Basketball League

They play in the Telekom Vanuatu Premier League or Port Vila Football League, the country's top football competition. Tupuji Imere Football club is the only club in Vanuatu who still maintain their position in the Premier League since the start in 1980

Honours
LBF Cup:
win (1): 2002 
PVFA Cup:
win (1): 2016 
Port Vila Football League:
Runners-up (1): 2007
2017-2018-port vila F.A championship winner

Current squad

References

Football clubs in Vanuatu
Port Vila